Episodes is a ballet choreographed by Martha Graham and George Balanchine, to compositions by Anton Webern. The ballet was a co-production between the Martha Graham Dance Company and Balanchine's New York City Ballet (NYCB). Though it was conceived to be a collaboration between Graham and Balanchine, leading choreographers in modern dance and neoclassical ballet respectively, they ultimately worked separately on the ballet's two halves. The first part was choreographed by Graham, for dancers from her company and four NYCB members, and depicts Mary, Queen of Scots remembering the events in her life before her execution. The second part, by Balanchine, is completely plotless, and made for members of the NYCB and Graham dancer Paul Taylor, who originated a solo. The ballet uses all seven orchestral compositions by Webern.

Episodes premiered on May 14, 1959, at the City Center of Music and Dance. Starting in 1960, Balanchine's section is presented as a standalone piece, with Taylor's solo removed the following year. Since then, Balanchine's Episodes had been revived by various other ballet companies. Taylor's solo was only performed in a few rare instances. The Graham section had only been revived once, in 1980, with the choreography significantly revised.

Choreography
The program for the premiere of Episodes described it as an 'homage by dancers to a great composer." In performances of the complete ballet, a five-minute intermission occurs between Episodes I and Episodes II. Most performances of Episodes since 1960 only include Balanchine's Episodes II.

Episodes I
The program described Episodes I as follows, Miss Graham's section of Episodes deals with the last minutes in the life of Mary Queen of Scots. It takes place at the scaffold and the characters are men and women who might well have been in the Queen's last thoughts. Bothwell, the man she most loved, was her third husband; determined to be King, he had used her to serve his ambition and treated her, so the court said, 'like a drab'. Darnley (her second husband), Rizzio and Chastelard, all three had died because of her. The four Marys, her ladies in waiting, had been her constant companions. Elizabeth of England, whom she had never met, was her cousin and enemy, and had signed the warrant for her execution. Miss Graham's choreography is a kind of dramatic fantasia about Mary Stuart's ultimate pride, about the façade of royalty and what must have been behind it.

The two pieces of music Graham used,  Passacaglia, op. 1 and Six Pieces, op. 6, are Webern's earlier works. The dancers are dressed in full 16th-century costumes. The set features a black platform at the back of the stage, decorated with heraldic symbols, with a black box at the center.

In 1980, Graham significantly revised the choreography, with more focus on the two queens, and Mary's three lovers removed. The solos were also rechoreographed.

Episodes II

The program only described Episodes II, "George Balanchine's section of the ballet refers to no story." Balanchine later said that in choreographing Episodes II, he "had try to paint or design time with bodies in order to create a resemblance between the dance and what was going on in the sound." He used four of Webern's later works, written after he began exploring serialism and inspired by Arnold Schoenberg's twelve-tone technique. Additionally, Balanchine used Webern's Ricercata, rearrangements of the ricercars in Bach's The Musical Offering. The dancers are dressed in practice clothes, while the minimal set features four poles.

Episodes II begins with Symphony, op. 21. It is danced by two lead dancers and three other couples. Balanchine described. "As the music starts, dryly and carefully. The boys touch the girls on the shoulder; they join hands then, pose briefly, and begin to move together. One couple leads the others but soon, just as the instrumentation shifts and develops, the other pairs react to the music differently. The dance is about the music, it is meant to look that way."

The second part, set to Five Pieces, op. 10, is a pas de deux. Author Jennifer Homans described the two dancers "in total darkness, each under a separate spotlight... Their steps were hieratic, angular, with splayed, trapped movements and tangled deadweight arms, and they were engrossed with each other but disconnected, with a musical but no narrative arc. At one point in this section, the man, as Homans described, lifts the woman "upside down on his back with her legs split like antler's horns around his head, which now seemed to emerge from her crotch."

The third part, set to Concerto, op. 24, is also a pas de deux, with four women accompanying the two dancers. Balanchine described, "The boy moves the girl as the composer moves his instrument." Allegra Kent, who originated the female role, called the section "a dance conversation," and the role "a continuation of his interest in the abstract use of the body and the man manipulating the woman."

Variations, op. 30 is a solo that was originated by Graham dancer Paul Taylor, and excluded from most stagings of the ballet. The solo is danced barefoot, and has three sections. The first two feature the same choreography, albeit danced to different music and with different intentions. Author Richard Buckle commented, "The white-clad dancer was called upon to clutch himself, wrap himself up and tie himself into such perverse knots that his number seemed almost a defiant demonstration by Balanchine that he could be as crazy as any 'modern' choreographer or dancer in existence. Taylor described, "Each phrase is densely packed with complicated moves – knotted arrangements that, spatially, all stay in one small spot. Very few of them come from the traditional ballet vocabulary, and when they do, are usually reshaped into flex-footed versions or inverted." Balanchine gave Taylor the imagery of a fly in a glass of milk, and Taylor in turn thought of a fly stuck in a "deadly vortex of its own making... an epigram about self-ordained patterns and death."

The ballet ends with the Ricercata, danced by two principals and a corps de ballet of thirteen women. Author Nancy Reynolds commented, "In contrapuntal manner, each dance movement – by a block of the ensemble or the soloists –  is an equal component of the whole stage picture at any single moment. Most movements are brief, often using only one part of the body at a time. The groups move fugally, in imitation (more or less freely) of the restatements of the musical object."

Development

Background and conception
Balanchine worked primarily in neoclassical ballet, and co-founded the New York City Ballet with Lincoln Kirstein in 1948. Meanwhile, Graham was a modern dance choreographer, and usually worked with her own company, the Martha Graham Dance Company. Kirstein often criticized modern dance, including a 1934 article in The New Republic, in which he attacked Graham. Despite his continued dislike of modern dance, he acknowledge in 1937 that he "was unequipped for her simplicity and self-blinded by her genuinely primitive expression." A collaboration between Balanchine and Graham was first pitched by painter Pavel Tchelitchew in December 1935. He suggested to the two choreographers and Kirstein that they collaborate on "an evening's spectacle involving three archetypes: Don Juan, Don Quixote, Hamlet," while Graham would be the corresponding "feminine archetype." The idea never came to fruition.

In the 1950s, Balanchine began listening to music by Anton Webern, after being introduced to his works by Igor Stravinsky. Balanchine spoke about Webern's works,Webern's orchestral music fills the air like molecules; it is written for atmosphere. The first time I heard it, I knew it could be danced to. It seemed to me like Mozart and Stravinsky, music that can be danced to because it leaves the mind free to see the dancing. In listening to composers like Beethoven and Brahms, every listener has his own ideas, paints his own picture of what the music represents. How can I, a choreographer, try to squeeze a dancing body into a picture that already exists in someone's mind? It simply won't work. But it will with Webern.

He had two ideas of using Webern's music for a ballet that were abandoned, before deciding to use all seven of Webern's orchestral compositions, which last under an hour together. Kirstein then suggested having Graham contribute on the choreography. Graham was approached about the ballet by Kirstein in January 1959, and he spoke about "key characters of feminine distinction" for her to dance. He thought about an interpretation of Alice's Adventures in Wonderland, which Kirstein believed to carry the "essence of Martha's spirit." Graham, unable to respond to this but still interested in the collaboration, suggested Mary, Queen of Scots instead. The title, Episodes, came from Tchelitchew's pitch.

The project was officially announced in late March, as part of NYCB's spring season that year. Cecil Beaton was first announced to be the designer of Graham's costumes, but NYCB costumer Karinska ultimately "designed and executed" costumes for the entire ballet, as credited in the program. David Hays designed the set and lighting. The legal contract for the co-production stated Ballet Society owned "all rights to the use of the title" and exclusive rights to Graham's choreography for three years.

Though the ballet is conceived as a collaboration, the two choreographers mostly worked on their parts separately. Graham said, "Collaboration was really not the term." Graham was set to choreograph the long opening and closing of the ballet, with Balanchine choreographing the rest. However, this plan "did not work out practically of theatrically," according to Graham. The two choreographed the two halves of the ballet instead, Episodes I by Graham and Episodes II by Balanchine. Graham dancer Linda Hodes noted that Graham was initially expected to choreograph on her own dancers, then teach the ballet to the NYCB dancers. However, after a meeting between Graham and Balanchine, in which they clashed over what she choreographed for his dancers, they decided to include Graham's dancers in the performances of the ballet, and the ballet became a co-production between the New York City Ballet and Martha Graham Dance Company, and at Kirstein's suggestion, incorporated each other's dancers in their choreography.

In the lead-up to the premiere, the ballet drew significant media attention and was described as "historic", due to contributions from leading choreographers of two different genres of dance. Walter Terry wrote in the New York Herald Tribune, "whether it turns out to be a success or only a fascinating experiment is of historical significance." The London-based Dance and Dancers reported, "news of historical importance to the international dance field has been made."

Graham
Graham was first assigned the score Passacaglia, op. 1. To understand it, she stayed in her studio and "played it and moved to it day after day after day." She studied Stefan Zweig and Raymond Preston's biographies on Mary, and was inspired by two poets, T. S. Eliot, whose poem East Coker referenced Mary, and Rainer Maria Rilke, who was Webern's favorite poet. Graham said she "found my articulation" from the two. Later, Graham realized she needed more music, so Balanchine gave her Six Pieces, op. 6, which he had already begun choreographing.

Graham also starred as Mary, with a stand-in in rehearsals. Four NYCB dancers appeared alongside the Graham company, including Sallie Wilson, who originated the role of Elizabeth I, as well Kenneth Peterson, Bill Carter and Paul Nickel, who had smaller roles in the ballet. According to Wilson, Graham initially gave her ballet steps, despite knowing little about them. Wilson then asked Graham to give her modern dance steps. Though Graham was glad about this request, she remained unsure whether Wilson could dance it, and other dancers assisted Wilson. Wilson said the result of her dancing in the manner of Graham was "marvelous." She added that the Graham dancers "were thrilled that I could actually move my back – they had expected a ramrod." Wilson recalled that in rehearsals, Graham would stop rehearsals and let everyone meditate. Graham also explained the symbols in the choreography, "each thing was weighted carefully."

Previously, Graham only worked with her own dancers and followed her own schedule. However, for Episodes, she did not have ultimate control over all elements. Instead, she had to follow Balanchine's concept and the NYCB mode of working, where multiple choreographers share rehearsal schedules. She also clashed with Kirstein numerous times, especially regarding the designs of the ballet. Though NYCB was under union regulations, all designs must be made under legal contracts and at union shops, Graham attempted to circumvent this. Graham was more cordial with Balanchine, and found him "so wonderful to work with, considerate and concerned – a joy to be with."

Balanchine
Only one Graham dancer worked with Balanchine, Paul Taylor. Taylor had some background in ballet, as he took classes taught by Margaret Craske during the 1950s. Kirstein, keen to work with Taylor, had previously invited Taylor to work on two projects, one as a choreographer and one as a dancer, but neither came into fruition. Balanchine was suffering from arthritis, and had difficulties demonstrating the steps to Taylor. Taylor, who originated a long solo, found Balanchine's process "a complete switch" from Graham, "The speed and craft in which he works are astounding, the rehearsal time being used economically, none if it taken up by explanations of concepts, poetic imagery, or motivation." Taylor was used to dancing Graham's plot-driven choreography, and initially struggled with Balanchine's more abstract concept. He also found the musicality and movement vocabulary to be more challenging than Graham's choreography. Fearing he would forget the complex choreography, Taylor would go home immediately after each rehearsal to draw stick figures and write notes for himself.

Prior to giving Six Pieces, op. 6 to Graham, Balanchine had spent four days choreographing to the score as a pas de deux for Diana Adams and Jacques d'Amboise, and nearly completed the pas de deux when Graham asked for more music. According to d'Amboise, Balanchine's vision of the pas de deux was "[a] version of first man and first woman," like Adam and Eve right after they ate the apple. Balanchine then made another pas de deux for Adams and d'Amboise, to Five Pieces, op. 10, and abandoned his original vision.

Original cast

Source:

Performances
Episodes premiered on May 14, 1959, at the City Center of Music and Dance, during NYCB's spring season. By popular demand, the season was extended for more performances of Episodes. The two company performed Episodes together again during NYCB's 1959 winter season, which was the last time Episodes was performed in full.

Starting in 1960, the Balanchine choreography is presented as a standalone piece, at the time under the title Episodes II. Taylor appeared at the New York City Ballet for two more seasons as a guest artist to dance his solo. In 1961, Taylor's part in the ballet was removed. He was invited to join NYCB, but chose to focus on his choreographic career and his company instead. Henceforth, the Balanchine ballet is presented as simply Episodes. 

Other ballet companies that had performed Balanchine's Episodes include Dutch National Ballet, Scottish Ballet, Berlin Opera Ballet, National Ballet of Canada, Boston Ballet, Miami City Ballet, Suzanne Farrell Ballet and Les Grands Ballets Canadiens.

NYCB had never danced Graham's choreography, though Kirstein did consider it. In 1965, Balanchine suggested Graham to revive both parts of the ballet for NYCB's fall season. She declined due to a scheduling conflict with her company, but she was open to such revival, "I hope your invitation will stand and that it can still take place at a time when we are not burdened as at present." Balanchine wrote in his 1977 book Balanchine's Complete Stories of the Great Ballets, "Miss Graham's part of Episodes has unfortunately not been seen for some years. It is our hope that one day it will be danced again." 

In 1980, the Graham company revived her Episodes at the Metropolitan Opera House, with the choreography significantly revised. Though the NYCB allowed Graham to use the original costumes by Karinska, her company used new costumes by Halston, while also using the original set by David Hays. This remains the only revival of Graham's Episodes.

Paul Taylor's solo
After Taylor's solo was cut from the ballet in 1961, he offered to teach it to whomever Balanchine chose, though Balanchine never took up this offer. It was not performed until 1986, three years after Balanchine's death, when Taylor reconstructed it for Peter Frame, then a soloist at the NYCB. Taylor cast Frame after spotting him at a company class, which Taylor was invited to observe by co-ballet master in chief Peter Martins. As Taylor's performance had never been filmed or notated, he relied on his notes and photographs to teach the role to Frame. Taylor removed knee works that would be dangerous to Frame's ballet-trained body. Frame continued to perform the solo until 1989, a year before his retirement.

In 2014, when the Miami City Ballet performed Episodes, Taylor's solo was included. Frame taught the solo to the company's dancers, based on an archival video of him dancing the solo in 1989, though he did not let the dancers watch the video, and only showed them photographs of Taylor. Jovani Furlan danced it on opening night.

In 2020, NYCB performed the solo again. The role was alternated between Furlan, who had since joined NYCB, and Michael Trusnovec, a former Paul Taylor Dance Company member who performed as a guest artist. As both Taylor and Frame died in 2018, Furlan taught the role to Trusnovec. The two watched videos of Frame dancing the solo in both 1986 and 1989, and found significant differences on the choreography between the two videos. Believing that the 1986 version is closer to the original, they restored some steps back to the solo. The solo was excluded from the ballet again in 2022.

Critical reception
Upon the premiere of Episodes, Times noted, "Vastly different in their approaches, both Balanchine and Graham were remarkably successful at illuminating Webern's sparse, mostly atonal scores—perhaps the world's unlikeliest music for dancing."

New York Times dance critic John Martin called the ballet "a truly remarkable creation." He commented on Graham's choreography, "the invention is superb and uncannily revelatory." As for Balanchine, Martin wrote, "The style in which he worked is a miracle of creativeness, far beyond anything he has done previously."

In another review published at the end of Episodes first season, Martin wrote, "What [Graham] has done is powerful, brilliant and well within the established conventions of her highly personal medium. Balanchine, on the other hand, has pushed his own equally characteristic approach into uncharted fields." Dance historian Angela Kane, however, found that some of the New York critics expressed their preference for Graham's contribution over Balanchine's.

References

External links 
Episodes on the New York City Ballet website
Episodes on the George Balanchine Trust website
Variations On A Solo, article about Taylor's solo on the New York City Ballet website

1959 ballet premieres
Ballets by Martha Graham
Ballets by George Balanchine
Ballets to the music of Anton von Webern
New York City Ballet repertory
Ballets based on actual events
Cultural depictions of Mary, Queen of Scots
Cultural depictions of Elizabeth I